Millport (Scottish Gaelic: Port a' Mhuilinn) is the only town on the island of Great Cumbrae in the Firth of Clyde off the coast of mainland Scotland, in the council area of North Ayrshire.

Due to its small size, the island and its town are often linked in the minds of visitors and residents and Cumbrae is often referred to as Millport. The island offers views across to the Isle of Arran as well as of its smaller neighbour which lies barely a kilometre away, called Little Cumbrae. The Cumbraes are referred to as the Kumreyiar in the medieval Norse Saga of Haakon Haakonarson.

Etymology 
The Gaelic name Cumaradh means "place of the Cymric people", referring to the Brittonic-speaking inhabitants of the Kingdom of Strathclyde. Alternatively, the name Cumbrae may derive from Kil Maura meaning "cell or church of a female saint".

History 
The Garrison House in the centre of town, constructed in 1745, was formerly the barracks/Captain's mansion, then the home of the Earl of Glasgow, and is now in community ownership (see "Current Developments" below).

During the development of the River Clyde as a main thoroughfare for goods, shipbuilding and smuggling, Millport was a strategic base for Customs and Excise. Several of the streets in Millport are named after crew members of the Revenue cutter Royal George.

The Victorian era was a period of rapid growth, both in terms of population, governance, amenities and property. To the west and east of the old harbour, many fine Victorian and Edwardian villas were built, along with new tenements. Many of these used rock mined from The Eileans. These large houses still form the backbone of the housing stock.

The Cathedral of the Isles of the Scottish Episcopal Church, completed in 1851, seats only 100 people. It is the smallest cathedral in Great Britain and is variously described as "the smallest cathedral in Europe", "the second smallest in Europe", or "probably the smallest in Europe". Various other churches such as the cathedrals in Nin and Zadar in Croatia lay claim to this title.

The local Lady Margaret Hospital was founded in 1900 and bears the name of Lady Margaret Crichton-Stuart, daughter of John Patrick Crichton-Stuart, 3rd Marquess of Bute as a tribute and mark of respect to the eldest daughter of Lord Bute.

Residents 
The usual island population of 1,376 as recorded by the 2011 census was a slight fall from the 2001 figure of 1,434. The population increases substantially during the summer tourist season.

The island has an active and engaged community with a wide range of interest groups represented in the many clubs and associations on the island. The island has its own radio online station, Radio Millport. The Guardian reported that Cumbrae was number 8 in British online property searches in 2021, attributing this to the effect of the COVID-19 lockdown then in force.

Governance 
The community is represented by The Cumbrae Community Council. Council members are elected by the residents, and all groups and individuals on the island are invited to its monthly meetings. The community council provides a connection with North Ayrshire council, and its members are formal members of Locality Planning Partnerships.

Developments 

The Garrison House was badly damaged after an arson attack in 2001. Cumbrae Community Development Company, the local development trust, made a successful bid to the National Lottery and other funders to enable the building to be re-constructed for community benefit. After several years of work renovation of the property was completed in 2008 at a total cost of £5 million. It now houses the Museum of the Cumbraes, a library, council offices, a GP surgery and the Garrison Café.

, developments on the island include:
 A flood protection scheme is being developed for the south of the island.
 A marina is proposed as part of the flood protection scheme works.
 Millport Town Hall is being brought back into use.
 A proposal is underway to buy the former National Watersports Centre and make it into a community facility called The Wave.
 A large development of around 40 family sized homes is underway between Millport Bowling Club and Penmachrie Farm.
 In 2011, Millport considered applying for city status, on the basis of having a cathedral. It would have been the smallest city in the UK.

Recreation 
As well as its numerous beaches, Millport has an 18-hole golf course with views over the Arran hills and the Firth of Clyde. Other recreational facilities include a crazy golf course, Millport Bowling Club with a putting green, and two football pitches. In addition to coastal sea fishing, primarily for mackerel, fly fishing is available at two fresh water reservoirs. 

The perimeter road around the island is used by walkers and cyclists and provides access to the island's beaches.

Tourism 
Millport has a hotel and guest house, and many properties are available as holiday lets. A motorhome site caters for short term stays.

The wide sandy beaches close to the centre of the town are popular for paddling and swimming. A live webcam at Newton Bay shows the weather on the island.

One of the best known landmarks in Millport is the Crocodile Rock, a rock on the foreshore that has been painted to look like a crocodile. It has been a feature since at least 1913 when Robert Brown was acknowledged by the council for the work. Sam Crawley currently of East Kilbride in Glasgow, created the iconic paintwork which is a tourist highlight on the island.

Millport has the world's narrowest house, The Wedge, which measures  at its front. The house is 22 feet long by 11 feet wide at its widest point.

Millport Bay is a popular destination for sailors in the summer, and has a number of donation-based visitor moorings. There is a small boatyard at the western end of the town.

The town hosts Scotland's biggest independent country music festival, the Millport Country Music Festival, in September each year, and a fireworks display is held during September.

The historic paddle steamer  calls at Millport twice a week during the summer, on trips originating at Ayr and Glasgow.

Education

Schools 
Primary-aged children on the island attend Cumbrae Primary School. Older children attend Largs Academy on the mainland.

FSC Millport 
FSC Millport is a biological teaching and research centre operated by the Field Studies Council. The centre's origins can be traced back to 1885, when the oceanographer Sir John Murray set up a floating laboratory in a lighter which he called 'The Ark'. This led to the establishment of the Millport Marine Biological Station in 1897 by the naturalist David Robertson, also known as the 'Cumbrae Naturalist'.

In 1970 the station became the University Marine Biological Station Millport of the University of London. In 2014 ownership transferred to the Field Studies Council, which  built new classrooms and accommodation for school and university visitors as well as providing holiday accommodation.

National Watersports Training Centre Cumbrae 
The National Watersports Training Centre was a Sportscotland facility that taught a wide range of courses including sailing, windsurfing, paddlesports, cruising and yachting. The centre closed in 2020, and a local group is planning to reopen the site for community use.

Transport links 
In spite of its relatively remote feel, Millport is only one hour's travel from major transport hubs of Glasgow Airport and Glasgow Central railway station. A bus to Millport meets each ferry.

In Popular Culture 
The town of Millport was the titular setting for the BBC Radio 4 comedy (Millport); written by Lynn Ferguson. The series was broadcast between 2000 - 2002, and recounts the lives of several Millport inhabitants including Irene Bruce (Played by Ferguson) and her sister Moira, with the former desperate to leave the isolate community and start her life anew in the mainland. The radio series also resulted in a television adaptation that did not progress beyond the pilot, the latter being not well-received by the islanders

References

External links

 Garrison House
Millport Field Studies Council 
Millport Golf Club
Millport Town Hall 
The Cumbrae Wave 
Live camera and weather forecast on the Isle of Cumbrae
Live camera and weather forecast at Largs ferry slip
Cumbrae Community website
Isle of Cumbrae Tourist Association

 
Towns in North Ayrshire
Towns with cathedrals in the United Kingdom
Towns on Scottish islands
Towns and villages in Buteshire
The Cumbraes
Firth of Clyde